Craig Edwin Bradley (born 23 October 1963) is a former Australian rules footballer and first-class cricketer. He is the games record holder at Carlton in the AFL/VFL, and in elite Australian rules football (the AFL/VFL, SANFL and WAFL).

Early life
Bradley was born in Ashford in suburban Adelaide.

Football

Port Adelaide (1981–1985)  
Bradley made his senior football debut in 1981 as a seventeen-year-old for Port Adelaide in the South Australian National Football League (SANFL), Port's third premiership in a row. At the end of 1981 Victorian Football League club Essendon approached Bradley to join them but he turned down the offer, wishing to remain in South Australia with Port Adelaide and to build on his promising cricket career.

In 1982, his second season, Bradley won Port Adelaide's Best and Fairest.

In 1984 Bradley would be selected in the Australian team to take on Ireland in the revival of the International Rules series.

In 1985 Bradley had won his third consecutive Port Adelaide best and fairest and was runner-up for the Magarey Medal.

Carlton (1986–2002) 
After 89 games with Port Adelaide, Bradley was recruited by VFL club Carlton in 1986 as part of a recruiting drive that also netted future captain Stephen Kernahan and Peter Motley.

Bradley won three Robert Reynolds Trophies as Carlton's Best & Fairest, in 1986, 1988 and 1993, as well as being a member of the 1987 and 1995 premiership sides. Bradley played with Carlton for seventeen seasons, acting as Kernahan's vice captain from 1990 until 1997, then captaining Carlton from 1998 to 2001.

In this time, Bradley also represented Australia three times in the International Rules series, including as vice-captain in 2000 and captain in 2001. He broke Bruce Doull's Carlton games record in Round 1, 2002.

In a senior career spanning 22 seasons, Bradley was renowned as one of the games tireless champions, and in particular his amazing fitness that meant he could play the physically demanding game of Australian rules football until the age of 38. For much of his career, Bradley played as an outside midfielder, rotating into the forward line during games, where his nous allowed him both to score and assist many goals through his career. In his final few seasons, Bradley spent more time acting as a loose, sweeping half-back flanker, and much of Carlton's drive forward came from his play through the wings.

Bradley's final AFL game, against Port Adelaide, was in Round 19, 2002, polling 3 Brownlow Votes at the age of 38 years and 289 days, making him the sixth-oldest player in the history of the league. His final appearance overall was in the 2002 International Rules series.

In November 2002, following Carlton's salary cap breach which lost the club valuable draft picks, Bradley had contemplated reversing his decision to retire and attempt to rebuild a club in crisis, but he eventually stood by his initial decision to retire from the game, which was made three weeks before the salary cap drama occurred.

Cricket 
Bradley played first-class cricket for South Australia and various Australian junior sides. After moving to Victoria to play for Carlton, he initially continued to play cricket for Victoria, although the increasing demands of football led him to retire from cricket after four first-class games.

He played grade cricket for Port Adelaide until 1987/88 (originally returning to South Australia each summer after the football season to do so), and from 1988/89 until his retirement from cricket after the 1991/92 season, he played district cricket in Victoria for the Melbourne Cricket Club. Bradley holds the distinction as the last active VFL/AFL player to win a Victorian district cricket premiership, achieving the feat in 1988/89, and had an agreement with the Carlton Football Club that district cricket finals took precedence over early season home-and-away football games if there was a clash.

Post football 
In 2007, Bradley returned to Carlton as a part-time assistant coach.

Honours 
Bradley's services to the game have been officially recognised several times at the highest levels. He was immediately inducted into the Australian Football Hall of Fame in 2006, after the minimum three years of retirement. At Carlton, Bradley is an Official Legend of the club's Hall of Fame, and was selected on the wing in the club's Team of the Century. He was also selected on the wing in Port Adelaide's Team of the Century.

Games record
Craig Bradley is the all-time games record holder in elite Australian rules football with 464 premiership (home-and-away and finals) matches: 89 for Port Adelaide in the SANFL from 1981 to 1985 (despite missing the last eight matches of the 1983 season touring England with the Young Australia cricket team), and 375 for Carlton in the VFL/AFL from 1986 to 2002, including 31 finals (7 for Port Adelaide and 24 for Carlton).

He also holds the Carlton club games record, and at the time of his retirement, ranked fourth for most games played in the VFL/AFL behind Simon Madden (378), Kevin Bartlett (403) and Michael Tuck (426). As of the 2022 Grand Final, he is ranked ninth.

Other matches
Bradley also played nine pre-season/night series matches for Port Adelaide, 19 State of Origin matches for South Australia from 1983 to 1999 (the final season of State of Origin), and 27 pre-season/night series matches for Carlton (these are counted as senior by the SANFL but not by the VFL/AFL). If these are included, then Bradley played a  total of 519 senior career games, which is the all-time record in elite Australian rules football.

Bradley also played nine International Rules matches for Australia, which are counted as senior by the VFL/AFL, who record Bradley's total as 501 career senior games, excluding his pre-season/night series matches for Carlton: if these are considered here, this gives Bradley an overall total of 528 career senior games.

Depending on the viewpoint taken:
 The AFL's total of 501 has Bradley's 500th senior game being the first International Rules test against Ireland at Croke Park in 2002.
 The total of 519 has Bradley's 500th senior game being against Richmond in Round 3 of the 2002 pre-season competition at the Docklands Stadium.
 The overall total of 528 has Bradley's 500th senior game being against St Kilda in Round 20 of 2001 at the Docklands Stadium.

Statistics

|-
|- style="background-color: #EAEAEA"
! scope="row" style="text-align:center" | 1986
|style="text-align:center;"|
| 21 || 25 || 30 || 12 || 386 || 215 || 601 || 145 ||  || 1.2 || 0.5 || 15.4 || 8.6 || 24.0 || 5.8 ||  || 9
|-
|style="text-align:center;background:#afe6ba;"|1987†
|style="text-align:center;"|
| 21 || 22 || 17 || 16 || 378 || 124 || 502 || 92 || 29 || 0.8 || 0.7 || 17.2 || 5.6 || 22.8 || 4.2 || 1.3 || 14
|- style="background-color: #EAEAEA"
! scope="row" style="text-align:center" | 1988
|style="text-align:center;"|
| 21 || 25 || 14 || 15 || 475 || 127 || 602 || 91 || 30 || 0.6 || 0.6 || 19.0 || 5.1 || 24.1 || 3.6 || 1.2 || 2
|-
! scope="row" style="text-align:center" | 1989
|style="text-align:center;"|
| 21 || 21 || 16 || 12 || 320 || 128 || 448 || 68 || 32 || 0.8 || 0.6 || 15.2 || 6.1 || 21.3 || 3.2 || 1.5 || 8
|- style="background-color: #EAEAEA"
! scope="row" style="text-align:center" | 1990
|style="text-align:center;"|
| 21 || 22 || 10 || 12 || 373 || 184 || 557 || 58 || 44 || 0.5 || 0.5 || 17.0 || 8.4 || 25.3 || 2.6 || 2.0 || 6
|-
! scope="row" style="text-align:center" | 1991
|style="text-align:center;"|
| 21 || 21 || 9 || 7 || 359 || 162 || 521 || 52 || 41 || 0.4 || 0.3 || 17.1 || 7.7 || 24.8 || 2.5 || 1.6 || 6
|- style="background-color: #EAEAEA"
! scope="row" style="text-align:center" | 1992
|style="text-align:center;"|
| 21 || 22 || 17 || 15 || 287 || 198 || 485 || 64 || 35 || 0.8 || 0.7 || 13.0 || 9.0 || 22.0 || 2.9 || 1.6 || 4
|-
! scope="row" style="text-align:center" | 1993
|style="text-align:center;"|
| 21 || 22 || 26 || 20 || 332 || 228 || 560 || 85 || 45 || 1.2 || 0.9 || 15.1 || 10.4 || 25.5 || 3.9 || 2.0 || 6
|- style="background-color: #EAEAEA"
! scope="row" style="text-align:center" | 1994
|style="text-align:center;"|
| 21 || 21 || 15 || 13 || 285 || 188 || 473 || 59 || 35 || 0.7 || 0.6 || 13.6 || 9.0 || 22.5 || 2.8 || 1.7 || 4
|-
|style="text-align:center;background:#afe6ba;"|1995†
|style="text-align:center;"|
| 21 || 25 || 12 || 12 || 373 || 211 || 584 || 100 || 30 || 0.5 || 0.5 || 14.9 || 8.4 || 23.4 || 4.0 || 1.2 || 10
|- style="background-color: #EAEAEA"
! scope="row" style="text-align:center" | 1996
|style="text-align:center;"|
| 21 || 19 || 17 || 10 || 314 || 137 || 451 || 66 || 36 || 0.9 || 0.5 || 16.5 || 7.2 || 23.7 || 3.5 || 1.9 || 6
|-
! scope="row" style="text-align:center" | 1997
|style="text-align:center;"|
| 21 || 22 || 12 || 11 || 436 || 151 || 587 || 76 || 32 || 0.5 || 0.5 || 19.8 || 6.9 || 26.7 || 3.5 || 1.5 || 15
|- style="background-color: #EAEAEA"
! scope="row" style="text-align:center" | 1998
|style="text-align:center;"|
| 21 || 19 || 7 || 9 || 267 || 160 || 427 || 62 || 28 || 0.4 || 0.5 || 14.1 || 8.4 || 22.5 || 3.3 || 1.5 || 10
|-
! scope="row" style="text-align:center" | 1999
|style="text-align:center;"|
| 21 || 26 || 9 || 11 || 430 || 196 || 626 || 96 || 35 || 0.3 || 0.4 || 16.5 || 7.5 || 24.1 || 3.7 || 1.3 || 18
|- style="background-color: #EAEAEA"
! scope="row" style="text-align:center" | 2000
|style="text-align:center;"|
| 21 || 21 || 15 || 2 || 281 || 168 || 449 || 51 || 34 || 0.7 || 0.1 || 13.4 || 8.0 || 21.4 || 2.4 || 1.6 || 12
|-
! scope="row" style="text-align:center" | 2001
|style="text-align:center;"|
| 21 || 23 || 14 || 7 || 344 || 177 || 521 || 94 || 24 || 0.6 || 0.3 || 15.0 || 7.7 || 22.6 || 4.1 || 1.0 || 10
|- style="background-color: #EAEAEA"
! scope="row" style="text-align:center" | 2002
|style="text-align:center;"|
| 21 || 19 || 7 || 8 || 236 || 146 || 382 || 58 || 36 || 0.4 || 0.4 || 12.4 || 7.7 || 20.1 || 3.1 || 1.9 || 4
|- class="sortbottom"
! colspan=3| Career
! 375
! 247
! 192
! 5876
! 2900
! 8776
! 1317
! 546
! 0.7
! 0.5
! 15.7
! 7.7
! 23.4
! 3.5
! 1.6
! 144
|}

See also
List of Victoria first-class cricketers
List of South Australian representative cricketers
List of Australian rules football and cricket players

References

External links 
 Craig Bradley at the Carlton Football Club website 
 
 Craig Bradley's profile in Blueseum

Port Adelaide Football Club (SANFL) players
Port Adelaide Football Club players (all competitions)
Carlton Football Club players
Carlton Football Club Premiership players
All-Australians (1953–1988)
Australian Football Hall of Fame inductees
South Australian State of Origin players
John Nicholls Medal winners
South Australia cricketers
Victoria cricketers
1963 births
Living people
Australian cricketers
All-Australians (AFL)
Cricketers from South Australia
Melbourne Cricket Club cricketers
South Australian Football Hall of Fame inductees
Australia international rules football team players
Two-time VFL/AFL Premiership players
Cricketers from Adelaide
Australian rules footballers from Adelaide